Spirit Animal is the third studio album by the space rock band Zombi. It was released in 2009 on Relapse Records. Alongside the synthesizer sounds of the group's previous recordings, Zombi utilizes electric guitar instrumentation for the first time on this album.

Track listing

Production
Mixed, engineered, and mastered by Steve Moore
All songs written by Zombi

Musicians
Steve Moore – bass, synthesizers, keyboards, guitars
A.E. Paterra – drums, percussion, synthesizers

References

2009 albums
Zombi (band) albums
Relapse Records albums